The Game of Liberty (U.S. title An Amiable Charlatan) is a 1915 novel by the British writer E. Phillips Oppenheim in which an aristocrat's son falls in love with a female thief.

Adaptation
In 1916 the book was turned into a silent film The Game of Liberty directed by George Loane Tucker.

References

Bibliography
 Goble, Alan. The Complete Index to Literary Sources in Film. Walter de Gruyter, 1999.

1915 British novels
Novels set in London
Novels by E. Phillips Oppenheim
British novels adapted into films
Cassell (publisher) books